Sefadzi Abena Amesu (born 17 May 1995) better known by her stage name as S3fa is a Ghanaian singer and songwriter. She is an afro-pop / afrobeats musician. S3fa won the Afrobeats Song of the year award during the 2022 Vodafone Ghana Music Awards with her song E Choke.

Early life and education 
S3fa comes from Afife a town in Volta Region, Ghana. Her father is an Ewe and comes from Afife whilst her mother is a Dagara who comes from Upper East Region. She is the second born of four siblings. S3fa attended Ola Girls Senior High School in Ho, Volta Region in 2014, before proceeding to Accra Technical University, where she graduated with a Diploma in purchasing and supply in 2017.

Music career 
S3fa started as a singer performing with live bands at bars, pubs and events in Accra. In 2017, she was signed by Black Avenue Muzik after D-Black, the Chief Executive of the record label reached out to her via social media platform Instagram. She released her debut single Marry me featuring Jupiter.

In May 2018, she released her second single titled Shuga featuring musical duo DopeNation in May 2018. In November 2020, she released her debut album Growth. The album was a twelve–tracked album which featured EL, Camidoh, Fameye, Sista Afia, Wendy Shay, Bisa Kdei, Medikal and Nigerian singer Praiz.

On 16 April 2021, she released a single titled E Choke, featuring Mr Drew. The song became popular due also due to its choreographed dance music video which became a trend and music challenge on TikTok and Instagram.

With her song E Choke, she won the Afrobeats song of the year award during the 2022 Vodafone Ghana Music Awards which fell coincidentally on her birthday.

Discography

Albums and mixtapes 

 Growth (2020)

Selected Singles 

 Marry me ft. Jupiter (2017)
 Shuga (2018)
 Echoke ft. Mr Drew (2021)
 Fever ft. Sarkodie & DJ Tira (2021)
 Soft life (2022)

Awards and nominations

References

External links 

 S3fa on Instagram

Living people
People from Volta Region
21st-century Ghanaian women singers
Ghanaian Afrobeat musicians
OLA Girls Senior High School (Ho) alumni
Accra Technical University alumni
1995 births